Austin Richard Davis (born February 3, 1993), nicknamed "Big Fudge", is an American professional baseball pitcher in the Houston Astros organization. He previously played in MLB for the Philadelphia Phillies, Pittsburgh Pirates and Boston Red Sox. He was selected by the Phillies in the 12th round of the 2014 MLB draft and made his major league debut in 2018.

Early life
Davis was born to Rick and Jeri Davis and grew up in Scottsdale, Arizona, where he was born. He attended Desert Mountain High School in Scottsdale, where he played baseball and was a first team All-Region and All-City.

Davis attended California State University, Bakersfield, and he played college baseball for the Cal State Bakersfield Roadrunners and majored in business. In two seasons with the Roadrunners, Davis posted a 5–10 win-loss record with a 4.56 earned run average (ERA) and 95 strikeouts over 28 appearances (28 starts). The Philadelphia Phillies selected Davis in the 12th round of the 2014 MLB draft.

Professional career

Philadelphia Phillies

Minor leagues
After signing, Davis made his professional debut in 2014 with the Rookie Gulf Coast League Phillies where he was 1–1 with three saves and a 2.59 ERA and 27 strikeouts in  innings pitched. In 2015, he played for the Class A Lakewood BlueClaws with whom he pitched to a 5–6 record with a 3.76 ERA in 33 games (11 starts) with 81 strikeouts in  innings.

In 2016, he split time between Lakewood and the Class A-Advanced Clearwater Threshers. In 13 relief innings pitched for Lakewood, Davis was 1–0 with one save and 17 strikeouts and did not give up an earned run, averaging 11.8 strikeouts per 9 innings, and in  innings pitched for Clearwater, he was 0–1 with one save and a 5.28 ERA with 18 strikeouts in  innings, averaging 10.6 strikeouts per 9 innings. He missed the first two months of the season due to injury.

Davis spent 2017 with both Clearwater and the Double-A Reading Fightin Phils, pitching to a 6–2 record with two saves and a 2.60 ERA and 75 strikeouts in  innings in 42 relief appearances between both clubs. He began 2018 with Reading and was promoted to the Triple-A Lehigh Valley IronPigs on June 1. Between the two teams, in 2018, he was 1–2 with a 2.82 ERA and 50 strikeouts in  innings, averaging 11.7 strikeouts per 9 innings.

In 2019 for Lehigh Valley, Davis was 4–1 with three saves and a 2.75 ERA, in 37 relief appearances in which he pitched 52.1 innings and struck out 64 batters, averaging 11.0 strikeouts per 9 innings. He was an International League mid-season All Star.

Major leagues
Philadelphia promoted Davis to the major leagues on June 18, 2018. He made his MLB debut on June 20 against the St. Louis Cardinals. He was the first Cal State Bakersfield baseball player to play in Major League Baseball. He finished the season with a 1–2 record with the Phillies, along with a 4.15 ERA and 38 strikeouts over the course of 32 appearances ( innings pitched), averaging 9.9 strikeouts per 9 innings.

In 2019 for the Phillies, Davis was 0–0 with a 6.53 ERA; in 14 relief appearances he pitched  innings and struck out 24 batters, averaging 10.5 strikeouts per 9 innings. During 2020 with the Phillies, Davis made four relief appearances, pitching to a 21.00 ERA without registering a decision. On August 21, 2020, Davis was designated for assignment by the Phillies.

Pittsburgh Pirates
On August 26, 2020, Davis was traded to the Pittsburgh Pirates for minor-league pitcher Joel Cesar and cash considerations. Davis recorded a 2.45 ERA in five appearances for Pittsburgh through the end of the season. On February 24, 2021, Davis was placed on the 60-day injured list due to a left elbow sprain; he was activated on June 6. Through July, Davis made 10 relief appearances for the Pirates and recorded a 5.59 ERA with a 0–1 record.

Boston Red Sox
On July 30, 2021, Davis was traded to the Boston Red Sox in exchange for infielder Michael Chavis. Through the end of the regular season, Davis made 19 appearances with Boston, compiling a 1–1 record with 4.86 ERA while striking out 17 batters in  innings. He returned to the Red Sox in 2022, appearing in 50 games (three starts) while compiling a 2–1 record with 5.47 ERA while striking out 61 batters in  innings. On August 29, Davis was designated for assignment.

Minnesota Twins
On August 31, 2022, Davis was claimed off waivers by the Minnesota Twins. In two relief appearances, he allowed three earned runs in  innings. On September 8, Davis was designated for assignment. He elected free agency on September 10, 2022.

Houston Astros
On November 16, 2022, Davis signed a minor league contract with the Houston Astros.

References

External links

Austin Davis at Baseball Almanac

Living people
1993 births
Baseball players from Scottsdale, Arizona
Major League Baseball pitchers
Philadelphia Phillies players
Pittsburgh Pirates players
Boston Red Sox players
Minnesota Twins players
Cal State Bakersfield Roadrunners baseball players
Florida Complex League Phillies players
Lakewood BlueClaws players
Clearwater Threshers players
Reading Fightin Phils players
Lehigh Valley IronPigs players
Bradenton Marauders players
Indianapolis Indians players